Poland competed at the 1995 World Championships in Athletics in Gothenburg, Sweden, from 5 – 13 August 1995.

Medalists

Sources 

Nations at the 1995 World Championships in Athletics
World Championships in Athletics
Poland at the World Championships in Athletics